Charles F. Templeton (June 21, 1856 – January 3, 1913) was an Attorney-General of the Dakota Territory and a justice of the Dakota Territorial Supreme Court from 1888 to 1889, and an attorney and judge in the Dakotas following their admission to statehood.

Early life and education
Born in Worcester, Washington County, Vermont, Templeton was of English descent, his ancestors being among the early colonists of New England. He graduated first in his class from the Barre Academy at Barre, Vermont, on June 10, 1874. He then entered Dartmouth College, where he "was quite prominent in athletics, taking numerous prizes", graduating on June 27, 1878, and thereafter reading law in the office of S. C. Shurtleff to gain admission to the bar in Montpelier, Vermont, on December 6, 1880.

Career in the Dakotas
In March 1881, he took up his residence in Fargo, Dakota Territory, having traveled there with businessman George B. Clifford. Templeton he entered into a law partnership with Burleigh F. Spalding, and practiced law there until November 1888, when he moved to Grand Forks. On March 12, 1887, he was appointed Attorney-General of Dakota by Territorial Governor Louis K. Church. He resigned on November 10, 1888, to accept an appointment from  President Grover Cleveland as an Associate Justices of the Supreme Court of the territory. At that time, justices represented districts of the territory, and Templeton was appointed to the Eighth Judicial District. He remained in this office until November 2, 1889, with the admission of North and South Dakota to statehood. At the first election for state officers in 1889, he was elected Judge of the First Judicial District in North Dakota, covering the Grand Forks area. He was reelected in 1892, serving until his retirement in 1896.

He resumed the practiced law in Grand Forks until 1907, when Governor John Burke appointed Templeton to again serve as Judge of the First Judicial District of North Dakota. Templeton was re-elected in 1908 and 1912, served in that capacity until his death.

Personal life
Templeton married Edna C. Carleton at Williamstown, Vermont on February 28, 1881. He died in Saint Paul, Minnesota, having gone there for medical attention. He left a widow, three daughters and one son.

References

Justices of the South Dakota Supreme Court
1856 births
1913 deaths
U.S. state supreme court judges admitted to the practice of law by reading law
People from Washington County, Vermont
Dartmouth College alumni
19th-century American judges